State Highway 201 (SH 201) is a short state highway that runs from I-14/US 190 south past the Killeen-Fort Hood Regional Airport, then east to SH 195.

Route description
SH 201 begins at a junction with SH 195 in Killeen.  It heads from this junction and then curves towards the north to an intersection with FM 3470 in Killeen.  SH 201 reaches its northern terminus at I-14/US 190 at Fort Hood.

History
SH 201 was designated on January 9, 1934 on a route from SH 126 in Munday to SH 24/US 82 for the purpose of assisting in moving a bridge. This route was cancelled when work was completed on September 11, 1934. The current route was designated on January 31, 2002.

Junction list

References

201
Transportation in Bell County, Texas